Sylvia Anne Reiner (born May 11, 1949) is an American author, playwright, poet and singer.

Her father was American producer, writer and actor Carl Reiner and her mother was actress Estelle Reiner (née Lebost). She is the younger sister of actor and director Rob Reiner, and the older sister of artist Lucas Reiner. Her parents were Jewish.

Bibliography
 This Nervous Breakdown is Driving Me Crazy: Short Stories, Dove Books (1996) 
The Long Journey of the Little Seed, Dove Kids (1996) 
The Potty Chronicles, A Story to Help Children Adjust to Toilet Training, Magination Press (1991) 
The Naked I, Red Dancefloor Press (1998), 
Beyond Rhyme & Reason: Poems,  Red Dancefloor Press (2002), 
A Visit to the Art Galaxy,  Simon & Schuster (Juv) (1990)

Audio
Dancing in the Park, Audio Literature (1996) 
The History of Christmas, narrated by Jack Lemmon, Audio Literature; Har/Cas edition (1996)

References 

1949 births
Living people
Jewish dramatists and playwrights
Jewish American poets
American women poets
Place of birth missing (living people)
American women dramatists and playwrights
Reiner family
21st-century American Jews
21st-century American women